Patterson is an unincorporated community in Lemhi County, Idaho, United States.

References

Unincorporated communities in Lemhi County, Idaho
Unincorporated communities in Idaho